St George's Church, Arreton, is a parish church in the Church of England located in Arreton, Isle of Wight.

History

The church is medieval and the earliest traces are from the Norman period.

Arreton's Church of St George is renowned. Part of this church dates from the 12th century. The church features a Saxon wall and a Burma Star window. 
The short tower with its unique buttresses contains a ring of 6 bells the oldest of which was cast in 1589.

In this parish lived Elizabeth Wallbridge. She became so famous that many people, including Queen Victoria visited her grave.

The war memorial was designed by local architect, Percy Stone (1856–1934).

Organ

The church has an historic organ dating from 1888 by the famous builder William Hill. A specification of the organ can be found on the National Pipe Organ Register.

References

Church of England church buildings on the Isle of Wight
Grade I listed churches on the Isle of Wight